Dildora Dilshod Kizi Aripova (born 29 January 2004) is an Uzbek artistic gymnast.  She represented Uzbekistan at the inaugural junior World Championships.

Early life
Aripova was born in Tashkent, Uzbekistan.  She began training in gymnastics in 2010 and joined the national team of Uzbekistan in 2016.

Gymnastics career

Junior

2017
Aripova made her international debut at the junior Asian Gymnastics Championships.  She placed 9h in the all-around, fifth balance beam, and eighth on floor exercise.  She next competed at the 2017 Voronin Cup where she placed fourth in the all-around behind Russians Aleksandra Shchekoldina and Vladislava Urazova and compatriot Anastasiya Miroshnichenko.  Additionally she placed fifth on uneven bars, fourth on balance beam, and second on floor exercise.

2018–19
Aripova began the 2018 season competing at the President's Cup in Almaty in the espoir division.  She won gold in the all-around, vault, balance beam, and floor exercise, and won silver on the uneven bars.  She next competed at the 2018 Junior Asian Championships where she placed sixth on uneven bars and floor exercise and helped Uzbekistan finish fourth.  She next competed at Tournoi International where she finished fourteenth and at the Voronin Cup where she placed seventh in the all-around, fourth on balance beam, and eighth on floor exercise.

In June 2019 Aripova competed at the inaugural Junior World Championships alongside Anastasiya Miroshnichenko and Anna Silnova.  Aripova finished 34th in the all-around and was the second highest placing Uzbek gymnast.  In December she competed at the Voronin Cup where she placed third in the all-around and on balance beam, fourth on vault, fifth on floor exercise, and sixth on uneven bars.

Senior

2021
Aripova turned senior in 2020; however the mass majority of competitions were either canceled or postponed due to the global COVID-19 pandemic.  She made her senior international debut at the Varna Challenge Cup where she finished first on floor exercise, tied with Hanna Szujó.  In October Aripova competed at the South Central Asian Championships alongside Anastasiya Miroshnichenko, Giunaz Jumabekova, and Ominakhon Khalilova.  They finished first as a team and individually Aripova scored the third highest all-around score but did not place due to Miroshnichenko and Khalilova scoring higher.  She qualified to two event finals.  During event finals Aripova won gold on the uneven bars and balance beam.

2022

Aripova competed at the Cairo World Cup. She placed eighth on uneven bars but won silver on floor exercise behind Hungarian Dorina Böczögő.  She next competed at the Baku World Cup.  She finished third on floor exercise.  At the Asian Championships Aripova finished twelfth in the all-around and qualified to compete as an individual at the 2022 World Championships.  Additionally she placed fourth during the floor exercise final.

In August Aripova competed at the Islamic Solidarity Games alongside Oksana Chusovitina and Ominakhon Khalilova.  They finished second as a team behind Turkey.  Individually Aripova placed second in the all-around behind Bengisu Yıldız but won gold on the balance beam.

Competitive history

References

External links
 

2004 births
Living people
Uzbekistani female artistic gymnasts
Sportspeople from Tashkent
21st-century Uzbekistani women